Ceromitia ilyodes is a moth of the  family Adelidae or fairy longhorn moths. It was described by Edward Meyrick in 1931. It is found in Argentina.

References

Moths described in 1931
Adelidae
Endemic fauna of Argentina
Moths of South America